Jimmywine Majestic is the second studio album by Red Red Meat, released in 1994 by Sub Pop.

Production
The album was recorded at Idful Studios, Chicago, and was produced by Brad Wood and Casey Rice.

Critical reception
Trouser Press wrote that the album "opens with a gnarled Stones riff (in the seething 'Flank'), dragging the listener on a trip that takes in all the usually hidden scenery the wrong side of the psychic tracks have to offer." The Chicago Reader called Jimmywine Majestic "a dazzlingly consistent, groove-heavy album." The Chicago Tribune called it "among the best albums of its era." The Washington Post wrote: "Woozy and slippery, the songs on the Meat's Jimmywine Majestic marry slide guitar and feedback, recalling the Stones at their bluesiest and most dissolute."

Track listing

Vinyl Reissue Jealous Butcher Bonus Tracks Cat. No. JB125 RELEASE DATE 11/06/2015

Personnel
Adapted from the Jimmywine Majestic liner notes.

Red Red Meat
 Brian Deck – drums, Hammond organ
 Glenn Girard – lap steel guitar, vocals
 Tim Hurley – bass guitar, vocals
 Tim Rutili – guitar, vocals

Additional musicians
 C.J. Bani – organ (13)
 Dan McDermott – percussion (9)
Production and additional personnel
 Brad Wood – recording

Release history

References

External links 
 

1994 albums
Red Red Meat albums
albums produced by Brad Wood
Sub Pop albums